Sumi may refer to:

People
 Sumi Jo (born 1962), South Korean lyric coloratura soprano
 Sumi, an honorific for Buddhist monks

Cultures
 Sümi Naga, one of the major Naga ethnic groups in Nagaland, India
 Sümi language spoken by the Sümi Nagas

Cinema
 Sumi (film) Marathi language feature film

Sport
 Sumi, of Miga, Quatchi, Sumi and Mukmuk, the mascots of the 2010 Winter Olympics and Paralympics
 Sumi gaeshi, one of the 40 original throws in Judo

Other uses
 Inkstick or Sumi ink, Japanese solid ink
 Ink wash painting or Sumi-e, Japanese ink wash painting
 Software Usability Measurement Inventory (SUMI), a questionnaire for assessing quality of use of software by end users

See also

 
 Sumii
 Sumitani
 Sume (disambiguation)
 Sumie (disambiguation)
 Sumy (disambiguation)